Michael Jerome Bernard (born November 8, 1948) is a former American basketball coach and player.  He played college basketball at Kentucky State. He was selected in the 1970 NBA draft by the Cincinnati Royals.

Early life, education, and playing career
Born and raised in Brockton, Massachusetts, Bernard graduated from Brockton High School in 1964. Bernard played college basketball at Kentucky State, graduating in 1970, the year Kentucky State won the NAIA national championship. In the 1970 NBA draft, the Cincinnati Royals selected Bernard in the seventh round, 107th overall. Bernard played professionally for the Wilmington Blue Bonnets of the Eastern Basketball Association from 1970 to 1972.

Bernard studied political science at Atlanta University (now Clark Atlanta University) during the 1976–77 school year.

Coaching career
Returning to Kentucky State, Bernard began his coaching career in 1974 as an assistant coach. After two seasons at Kentucky State, Bernard was an assistant coach at Norfolk State, then in NCAA Division II, from 1978 to 1984.

In 1985, Bernard got his first head coaching position at North Carolina Central, a Division II school at the time. Accumulating a 115–56 record, Bernard was head coach at North Carolina Central from 1985 to 1991. Bernard led the Eagles to a 28–4 record and NCAA Division II national championship in the 1988–89 season, for which he was named Division II Coach of the Year by Kodak.

Bernard was then head coach at Norfolk State from 1991 to 1998, going 141–67 in seven seasons. Under Bernard, Norfolk State made two deep runs in the NCAA Division II Tournament, qualifying for the Final Four in 1994 and Elite Eight in 1995. Bernard's final season at Norfolk State was in 1997–98, when the team went 6–21 in the school's first season at the Division I level.

From 1998 to 2002, Bernard was head coach at Division II Fayetteville State, going 65–44 in four seasons. However, in August 2002, the Fayetteville Observer reported that Bernard falsely claimed in his résumé to have completed a master's degree at Clark Atlanta, leading Fayetteville State to start an investigation. On August 8, the day the Observer story was published, Fayetteville State decided to fire Bernard.

Bernard became head coach at Shaw on September 9, 2002, days after the resignation of Joel Hopkins.

He was an assistant coach at Delaware State under head coach Greg Jackson from 2006 to 2009. Then from 2009 to 2012, he served as director of basketball operations on Jackson's staff.

Head coaching record

References

External links
 Michael Bernard's profile at the Official Site of Delaware State Athletics

1948 births
Living people
American men's basketball coaches
American men's basketball players
Basketball coaches from Massachusetts
Basketball players from Massachusetts
Cincinnati Royals draft picks
Clark Atlanta University alumni
College men's basketball head coaches in the United States
Delaware State Hornets men's basketball coaches
Kentucky State Thorobreds basketball coaches
Kentucky State Thorobreds basketball players
Fayetteville State Broncos basketball coaches
Norfolk State Spartans men's basketball coaches
North Carolina Central Eagles men's basketball coaches
Place of birth missing (living people)
Shaw Bears men's basketball coaches
Sportspeople from Brockton, Massachusetts